Rastafari Teach I Everything is Jamaican reggae artist Sizzla's 12th studio album, released on Greensleeves on September 4, 2001.

Track listing
"Rastafari Teach I Everything" (Burrell, Collins, Crosdale, Dunbar) - 4:44
"Beautiful" (Burrell, Collins, Donald Dennis, Dunbar, Smith) - 4:02
"Yes I Get High" (Burrell, Collins, Dennis) - 3:26
"Better Make Sure" (Burrell, Collins, Malachi, Meredith) - 4:08
"Revenge" (Burrell, Collins, Dennis) - 3:53
"Planet Earth" (Burrell, Collins, Edmund) - 4:18
"Escape from Prison" (Burrell, Collins, Dennis) - 3:51
"Give Her the Loving" (Burrell, Collins, Dennis) - 4:43
"It This" (Burrell, Collins, Dennis) - 3:32
"No Problem" (Burrell, Collins, Dennis) - 3:59
"Stay Clean" (Burrell, Collins, Dennis) - 3:17
"Energy" (Burrell, Collins, Dennis, Dunbar) - 3:48
"Make Love" (Burrell, Collins, Edmund, Valentine) - 4:17

Credits
 Philip "Fatis" Burrell - producer
 Paul Crosdale - organ, piano
 Paul Daley - engineer
 Donald Dennis - bass, instrumentation
 Paul "Teetimus" Edmund - bass, drums, keyboards, instrumentation
 Mark Harrison - engineer
 Garfield McDonald - engineer, mixing
 Chris Meredith - bass, keyboards
 Robert Murphy - engineer, mixing
 Delroy "Fatta" Pottinger - engineer
 Earl "Chinna" Smith - guitar
 Nigel Staff - keyboards
 Stephen Stanley - keyboards, mixing
 Rudy Valentine - guitar, assistant engineer, mixing assistant
 Collin "Bulbie" York - engineer

References

External links
 Sizzla website
 Greensleeves website

2001 albums
Sizzla albums